Cordelia Hood (née Dodson)  (1913–2011) was an American counter-intelligence agent with the Office of Strategic Services (O.S.S.) during the Second World War and was employed by the Central Intelligence Agency for similar work during the Cold War.

A native of Portland, Oregon, Cordelia Dodson graduated from Reed College in 1936 and then completed a Master's Degree in German at Reed.

She married a fellow CIA officer William J. Hood, who was chief of station in Frankfurt and later West Berlin during the 1950s.  Trento in his research found that Mrs. Hood was considered a very competent officer.

She later divorced Hood, but remained in the CIA until she retired in 1970.  After that she continued to work on contract with the CIA for another decade.

She died of respiratory failure at her home in Damariscotta, Maine on July 14, 2011.

References
Bernstein, Adam. Obituary  The Washington Post
Joseph J. Trento, The Secret History of the CIA (Carroll & Graf, 2005), p177

1913 births
2011 deaths
People from Portland, Oregon
People of the Central Intelligence Agency
Reed College alumni
People from Damariscotta, Maine
Deaths from respiratory failure